Donald Ray Miles   (March 13, 1936 – April 26, 2011) was an American outfielder in Major League Baseball who played in eight games for the Los Angeles Dodgers during the 1958 season.

External links

1936 births
2011 deaths
Major League Baseball outfielders
Los Angeles Dodgers players
Kokomo Dodgers players
Victoria Rosebuds players
St. Paul Saints (AA) players
Spokane Indians players
Dallas–Fort Worth Spurs players
Bakersfield Dodgers players
Baseball players from Indiana
Indianapolis Greyhounds baseball players